Bijan Birang  (Born:1950, Tabriz, Iran) is an Iranian film director, producer, scriptwriter in the Persian cinema and Media.

Early life 
Birang was born in 1950 in Tabriz, Iran. He then went to University of Tehran, Department of Fine Arts in 1976 and finally emigrated to United States and graduated from University of Southern California in the field of  Educational technology.

Birang started his cinematic career by screenwriting. Then he resumed his career by involving on IRIB's projects, such as comedy and children's programs .

Filmography

Cinema 
 1 - Iranian dinner (2011)
 2 - The Love Story (2006)
 3 - Cinderella  (2001)
 4 - Ali and jungle's devil (1988)

Series 
 Love is not Closed (2014)

References 
Cinema Monthly Magazine "Film". 12th year.  No. 156.  Page 104.  Special Issue for  Nowruz of 1993. Tehran, Iran.

External links

Living people
People from Tabriz
Iranian directors
Iranian filmmakers
University of Southern California alumni
University of Tehran alumni
Iranian film producers
Persian cinema articles needing attention
Persian cinema articles needing attention to supporting materials
1950 births